Canistropsis billbergioides is a species of flowering plant in the genus Canistropsis. This species is endemic to Brazil.

Two forms may be recognized:
Canistropsis billbergioides f. azurea
Canistropsis billbergioides f. billbergioides

Gallery

References

BSI Cultivar Registry Retrieved 11 October 2009

billbergioides
Flora of Brazil
Plants described in 1830